Martin Richard Asher is an American lawyer and former recording company executive. He is currently an affiliate professor of music business and an advisor to the undergraduate commercial music program at Florida Atlantic University.

Biography 
Dick Asher became widely known to the general public through Frederic Dannen's 1990 book Hit Men: Power Brokers And Fast Money Inside The Music Business, which chronicled Asher's music industry career, particularly focussing on his tenure as Deputy President of Columbia Records between 1979 and 1983, his corporate and personal battles with controversial label president Walter Yetnikoff, and Asher's attempts in the early 1980s to expose and defeat the growing influence of a cabal of independent record promotion agents known as "The Network".

A veteran of the United States Marine Corps, Asher received degrees from Tufts University and Cornell Law School before beginning his working life as a corporate lawyer. His music industry career began in the mid-1960s when he was appointed as Vice President of Business Affairs for the CBS  (now Sony Music) group of record labels, which included the Columbia and Epic Records labels. One of his first major duties at CBS was a 1966 meeting with Bob Dylan in Woodstock, New York, shortly after Dylan's legendary motorcycle accident, to negotiate the renewal of Dylan's Columbia recording contract. Asher rapidly gained a reputation for his honesty, integrity, loyalty, thoroughness and able business administration. In 1970 he was appointed Vice President of Capitol Reocrds' east coast division, but the move was not a successful one for Asher (Dannen described it as "a disaster") and in 1971 Asher gratefully accepted Columbia president Clive Davis's offer to return to CBS.

In 1972 he was sent to London to take over Columbia's loss-making UK division, which he soon returned to profit, and he was subsequently promoted to become the head of CBS' entire overseas recording operation.

In 1979 the music industry experienced a major and rapid downturn in sales, and the CBS labels suffering a serious drop in profits. To deal with this crisis, then CBS Chief Operating Officer John Backe created the new position of Deputy President of Columbia Records and appointed Asher to the role, where he implemented a stringent but effective (although very unpopular) round of cost-cutting, during which he was obliged to retrench hundreds of CBS staff.

One area of expenditure that soon became a matter of particular concern to Asher was the large and rising cost of payments to independent promotion agents, and Asher calculated that this little-known facet of the company's operation was by then costing CBS alone around $10 million annually. For most of their history, music publishers and record labels had long used "song pluggers", freelance promotions agents who were hired on a casual basis to promote and sell new sheet music - and later, new record releases - to department and music stores,  and radio station program directors. For many years this had been a relatively low-cost operation, but through the late 1960s and early 1970s, the combination of increasing competition between record labels, the enormous increase in the volume of new records, and the development of the restrictive Top 40 radio programming format meant that by the mid-1970s record labels were finding it increasingly difficult to get new releases placed into radio station playlists by their house marketing staff, and the American labels began to rely more and more heavily on a small group of powerful and influential independent promoters.

As he investigated Columbia's expenditures during 1979, Asher quickly realised that the cost of paying these "indies" (independent promotion agents) had skyrocketed - when he took over the CBS UK operation in 1972, an "indie" might only charge around $100 per week, but by 1980 it was estimated that the major labels were paying $100,000-$200,000 or more per record to hire these agents to promote their products to radio, and it was calculated that, industry-wide, the practice was by then costing at least $50 million annually. He also discovered that a group of the top independent American agents had organised themselves into a loose association known as "The Network", and that this group now had a virtual stranglehold over this crucial area of record company promotions.

In late 1979 Asher decided to test the power of The Network by deliberately not paying their agents to promote the new Pink Floyd single "Another Brick in the Wall" to radio stations in Los Angeles. The results dramatically validated his concerns - despite the fact that the group was the talk of the town at the time, performing sell-out concerts and garnering rave reviews, not one of the major L.A. radio stations would add the single to their playlist - but once the company resumed payments, the single quickly entered the Top 40, and in February 1980 its parent LP The Wall went to #1 on the Billboard album chart, where it remained for the next four months.

For several reasons Asher was determined to stop the practice of paying these "indies", but his crusade was strongly opposed by his boss, Columbia's volatile President, Walter Yetnikoff, who personally disliked Asher and disagreed with many of his this business decisions. Yetnikoff strenuously defended the use of the "indies" as being essential to the company's business. Asher however was now greatly concerned about the wider ramifications of this practice - he realised that "The Network" was, in effect, an industry-wide extortion racket whose real power lay in its ability to prevent records from getting to radio, and he also suspected that its leaders may have had links to organised crime. Asher feared that this could precipitate another major scandal, on the scale of 1950s payola debacle, which destroyed the career of top DJ Alan Freed. Asher knew that there were instances of apparent fraud, in which the Network agents were charging large sums for the placement of records that in fact were never even played on radio, and that the use of "indies" could be construed as bribery. He also feared that these practices could have disastrous consequences for his company, because if it was found that the CBS labels had been involved in any criminal activity, the Federal Communications Commission had the power to suspend or even revoke the all-important broadcast licences held by Columbia's parent, CBS Inc. which operated the CBS television and radio networks.

In 1981, with concern across the industry growing, and after negotiations between the major labels, CBS and Warner Communications agreed to a joint boycott on payments to The Network, but it fizzled out after only a few weeks, and the labels soon returned to paying the Network. Asher later found that one of his own labels, Epic, had been evading the boycott almost from the beginning, by hiding payments to The Network as "tour promotions" and other costs.

By early 1983 Asher's financial efforts at CBS were reaping rewards, and the company posted its biggest quarterly profit since the late '70s, but in mid-April he was called to a meeting with Yetnikoff, who told him that CBS Music's new CEO Thomas Wyman "had problems" with him. Shocked and puzzled, Asher began to question Yetnikoff about the claim, but at this point the obviously uncomfortable Yetnikoff abruptly got up, left the room and (as Asher soon discovered) he immediately went home. Yetnikoff then deliberately avoided Asher for days. Asher eventually contacted Wyman and arranged a meeting, where Wyman told him that it was in fact Yetnikoff who "had problems" with Asher. Asher then searched the building trying to find Yetnikoff to discuss and hopefully resolve the issue, but he later found out that Yetnikoff had been deliberately hiding in another executive's office so that Asher could not find him. The following Friday Asher came to work to discover that his regularly scheduled weekly staff meeting had been cancelled, and that he had been ordered to come to Yetnikoff's office. There Asher was confronted by Yetnikoff and Wyman, who presented and demanded that Asher sign a one-line press statement announcing that he had left CBS. A stunned Asher refused to sign, despite repeated demands by Yetnikoff and Wyman, and he then insisted on seeing his lawyer. Asher realised he was being fired, but after consulting his lawyer, he realised that it would be pointless to fight the company and he acquiesced to his dismissal.

Asher then spent almost a year "in the wilderness", during which time he found it almost impossible to find work, and was shunned by former colleagues, but in 1984, in a surprise move, he was brought in to act as a senior consultant on the proposed merger between the Warner and Polygram music groups. Ultimately Federal Trade Commission refused to approve the merger, but Asher had by then been appointed as a senior Vice-President at Warner Communications, and in October 1985 he was headhunted to become the new President and Chief Executive of Polygram Records Inc.

References 

Dannen, Frederic, Hit Men: Power Brokers and Fast Money Inside The Music Business, Vintage Books, 1991

Year of birth missing (living people)
Living people
American lawyers
American chief executives